The Squash Colombia Open 2016 is the men's edition of the 2016 Squash Colombia Open, which is a tournament of the PSA World Tour event International (prize money: $115,000). The event took place at the Plaza de la Aduana in Cartagena in Colombia from 16 to 20 of February. Mohamed El Shorbagy won his first Squash Colombia Open trophy, beating Omar Mosaad in the final.

Prize money and ranking points
For 2016, the prize purse was $115,000. The prize money and points breakdown is as follows:

Seeds

Draw and results

See also
2016 PSA World Tour
Squash Colombia Open

References

External links
PSA Squash Colombia Open 2016 website
Squash Colombia Open 2016 SquashSite page

Squash tournaments in Colombia
Squash Colombia Open
2016 in squash